Fernando Manuel Alonso Gómez de Valdés y Castillo (21 January 1931 – 28 August 2020) was a Mexican actor and comedian. A member of the Valdés family, he was the brother of Ramón Valdés, who portrayed Don Ramón on the sitcom El Chavo, and Germán Valdés (a.k.a. "Tin Tan"). He was also the father of singers Cristian Castro and Marcos Valdés.

Personal life

Manuel Valdés was born on 21 January 1931 in Ciudad Juárez, Chihuahua. His parents were Rafael Gómez-Valdés Angellini and Guadalupe Castillo. Valdés had eight siblings: Rafael, Germán, Guadalupe, Pedro, Armando, Ramón, Cristóbal, and Antonio.

The Valdés-Castillo family moved to Nuevo Laredo when Manuel was seven years old because the elder Valdés worked for the Mexican customs agency and had to move frequently. Germán Valdés was already successful as Tin-Tan. He wanted to buy the family a house, but his father turned him down and they moved to Mexico City.

At the age of 13, Manuel had his first film experience, working as an extra in El hijo desobediente and receiving a payment of 12 pesos. He took up dancing and at the age of 19 and became a dancer with Televicentro. His first experience as a comedian was on Variedades de medio día alongside Héctor Lechuga. "El Loco" Valdés is considered the first true television comedian.

Valdés had twelve children, including Norma, Arcelia, Manuel, Jorge, Fernando, Alejandro, Norma, Oscar, Marcos, and Christian.  Christian is the son of actress Verónica Castro.

Filmography

Films

Tender Pumpkins (1949)
Oh Darling! Look What You've Done! (1951)
You've Got Me By the Wing (1953)
It Is Never Too Late to Love (1953)
The Unknown Mariachi (1953)
The Cha Cha Cha Widows (1955)
Look What Happened to Samson (1955)
Trip to the Moon (1958)
Música de siempre (1958)
A Thousand and One Nights (1958)
Dangers of Youth (1960)
The Phantom of the Operetta (1960)
Tom Thumb and Little Red Riding Hood (1962)
The Loving Ones (1979)
Midnight Dolls (1979)
La leyenda de la Nahuala (2007)

Television
La Carabina de Ambrosio (1978–1984)
¡Vivan los niños! (2002)
Siempre te amaré (2000)
Entre el amor y el odio (2002)
Amy, la niña de la mochila azul (2004)
Como dice el dicho (2012)

Death
Valdés died on 28 August 2020 from complications of cancer. He was wearing a jersey of Club América when he was cremated the following day.

References

External links

1931 births
2020 deaths
Mexican male comedians
Mexican male film actors
Mexican male telenovela actors
Mexican male television actors
Mexican people of Spanish descent
Mexican people of Italian descent
People from Ciudad Juárez
20th-century comedians
21st-century comedians
20th-century Mexican male actors
21st-century Mexican male actors